Paul Carney (27 April 1943 – 24 September 2015) was a judge of the Irish High Court and the presiding judge of its criminal division, the Central Criminal Court.

Biography
Carney was born in Dublin. He was regarded as a leading expert on Irish criminal law and presided over murder and rape trials since his appointment to the High Court in 1991.

Carney was a former student of Gonzaga College, and a graduate of University College Dublin and King's Inns. He was called to the Bar in 1966 and was appointed a judge of the High Court in 1991. Both his parents were academics and founded a Department of Celtic Studies at the University of Uppsala, Sweden.

In May, 2006 he was appointed an Adjunct Professor of the Faculty of Law in University College, Cork.

In September, 2008 he was appointed an Adjunct Professor of the Department of Law & Business at NUI Maynooth, Kildare.

Prior to being appointed a judge, Paul Carney was a member of the Progressive Democrats. Carney retired on 24 April 2015 and died on 24 September 2015 at the age of 72.

Criminal Division, High Court
Carney, as the "listing judge" of the criminal division of the High Court and the only judge permanently assigned to the Central Criminal Court, heard seven out of every 10 rape cases and over half of all murder trials in the State.

Controversies

Wearing of wigs
His views on many issues were controversial, and his insistence upon wigs being worn and titles used in public courtrooms that he was serving in resulted in his being rebuked by his superiors.

Patrick O’Brien bail
On 21 January 2013, Carney sentenced 72-year-old sex offender Patrick O’Brien to 12 years in jail with nine years suspended for raping and sexually assaulting his daughter. Carney then granted the convicted man bail pending an appeal, which was considered by legal commentators to be "very unusual" since bail is usually only granted before someone is sentenced. Three days later Carney revoked the bail, and apologised and admitted he was wrong and insensitive to the victim.

References

External links
Judge with one eye on the media. The Sunday Business Post 13 April 2003
 http://www.independent.ie/national-news/courts/gangrape-woman-arrested-during-trial-following-overdose-3017017.html

1943 births
2015 deaths
Academics of University College Cork
Alumni of King's Inns
Alumni of University College Dublin
High Court judges (Ireland)
People educated at Gonzaga College